Benjamin Stephenson (July 8, 1769 – October 10, 1822) was the Congressional Delegate for the Illinois Territory from 1814 until 1817, and a delegate to the Constitutional Convention which enabled Illinois' statehood.

Early and family life

Born in Gettysburg, Adams County, Pennsylvania to the former Maria Reed (1742-1828) and her husband James Stephenson (1740-1804), the family moved to Martinsburg, Berkeley County, Virginia (now West Virginia) by 1790, where his father died in 1804. His eldest brother William would move to Knoxville, Tennessee with their mother and sisters, and his middle brother James would remain in western Virginia, serve in the militia and likewise become a congressman.
He married Lucy Swearingen (1788-1850), daughter of Virginia militia Col. Van Swearingen; their son James W. Stephenson would become an Illinois state senator and embroiled in scandals.

Career

Stephenson moved to Kentucky before his father's death in 1804, and then further westward to the Illinois Territory around 1809.

He became sheriff of Randolph County, Illinois in 1809.

A colonel in the Illinois militia, Stephenson commanded a regiment during the War of 1812. In 1813 he was appointed adjutant general of Illinois. A Democratic-Republican and ally of Governor Ninian Edwards, Stephenson served as the representative of the Illinois Territory in the United States Congress from 1814 to 1816, after which he became receiver of Public Monies, appointed by Edwards. Stephenson was a representative to the convention that wrote the first constitution for the State of Illinois in 1818.
In 1820, Stephenson owned seven slaves in Madison County.

Death and legacy

Stephenson died on October 10, 1822, and is buried in Edwardsville, Madison County, Illinois.  His widow soon moved to Carlinville, Macoupin County, Illinois, where she was buried in 1850. Stephenson County, Illinois was named for him. The Benjamin Stephenson House in Edwardsville, which he finished shortly before his death, remains and was placed on the National Register of Historic Places in 1980. Now owned by the City of Edwardsville, it is one of the oldest houses still standing in the State.

See also

James W. Stephenson

References

External links

1769 births
1822 deaths
Illinois sheriffs
Adjutants General of Illinois
American militia officers
American militiamen in the War of 1812
Delegates to the United States House of Representatives from Illinois Territory
Illinois Democratic-Republicans
Military personnel from Martinsburg, West Virginia
People from Edwardsville, Illinois
People from Randolph County, Illinois
Politicians from Martinsburg, West Virginia
Stephenson County, Illinois